Drangan is a village, census town and civil parish in County Tipperary, Ireland. It is in the historical barony of Middlethird. As of the 2016 census, Drangan had a population of 145 people.

The village's Catholic church is dedicated to Saint Mary and was built in 1850. A statue of Michael Cusack was erected nearby . During the Irish War of Independence in June 1920, the IRA's 3rd Tipperary Brigade (which included Dan Breen, Seán Hogan, Ernie O'Malley and Séumas Robinson) attacked and captured the Royal Irish Constabulary barracks in Drangan.

The local primary school, Drangan National School, is a co-educational school made up of St Patrick's Junior School and St Patrick's Senior School.

References

Civil parishes of Middle Third, County Tipperary
Towns and villages in County Tipperary